Robin Olsson (born May 30, 1989, in Luleå) is a Swedish ice hockey player. He is currently playing with Luleå HF in the Elitserien.

References

External links

1989 births
Living people
Luleå HF players
Swedish ice hockey defencemen
Örebro HK players
People from Luleå
Sportspeople from Norrbotten County